4eva Is a Mighty Long Time is the third studio album by American rapper Big K.R.I.T., released on October 27, 2017, through Multi Alumni and BMG Rights Management. A double album, it is his first full-length release since his departure from Def Jam in 2016. The album features guest appearances from T.I., Lloyd, Bun B, Pimp C, CeeLo Green, Sleepy Brown, Joi, Jill Scott, Keyon Harrold, Bilal, Robert Glasper, Kenneth Whalum and Burniss Earl Travis II.

4eva Is a Mighty Long Time was supported by four singles: "Confetti", "Keep the Devil Off", "Aux Cord" and "1999". The album charted at number seven on the US Billboard 200, and received generally positive reviews from critics.

Singles 
The album's first single, "Confetti", was released on September 28, 2017. The album's second single, "Keep the Devil Off", was released on October 6, 2017. The album's third single, "Aux Cord", was released on October 20, 2017. The album's fourth single, "1999" featuring Lloyd, was released to urban contemporary radio on February 6, 2018.

Critical reception 

4eva Is a Mighty Long Time was met with generally positive reviews. At Metacritic, which assigns a normalized rating out of 100 to reviews from mainstream publications, the album received an average score of 80, based on seven reviews. Aggregator AnyDecentMusic? gave it 7.2 out of 10, based on their assessment of the critical consensus.

Emanuel Wallace of RapReviews gave the album a near perfect score, stating "Big K.R.I.T. does a good job of separating the two personas at the end of the day. If the album was about 5 or 6 minutes shorter, it could have fit on a single disc but perhaps at the expense of the narrative. The double disc format really helps to drive home the point when the listener wants to switch from Big K.R.I.T.'s "Get Away" to Justin Scott's "Keep the Devil Off". Aaron McKrell of HipHopDX gave a positive review, stating "It does highlight Justin Scott and Big K.R.I.T. in their truest essence; spiritual, witty, and loyal to Mississippi, with overly soulful, southern production. Thanks to 4eva Is a Mighty Long Time, Justin Scott has once and for all ensured that his musical legacy is worth remembering". Kyle Mullin of Exclaim! stated: "There are plenty of other highlights to be raved about in 4eva Is a Mighty Long Times massive tracklist. Do yourself a favour: pick up this LP and immerse yourself not only in its impressive breadth, but also its practically unparalleled depth."

Clayton Purdom of The A.V. Club said, "The tough, chest-beating first disc gives way to a second disc that's just a little too fond of syrupy interludes. But as with his other releases, K.R.I.T.'s signature sincerity reigns supreme". Matthew Ismael Ruiz of Pitchfork noted, "Subwoofers are admittedly very cool, but by volume 4 ("Subenstein (My Sub IV)") of K.R.I.T.'s magnum opus of adulation for the bass speakers, the conceit has worn a little thin. Still bumps, though". Paul Simpson of AllMusic wrote: "4eva Is a Mighty Long Time is a mighty long album, at 20 songs and two brief skits, but K.R.I.T. clearly has a lot to say, and he expresses it with vigor and passion on this ambitious work."

Year-end lists

Commercial performance
4eva Is a Mighty Long Time debuted at number seven on the US Billboard 200 with 33,000 album-equivalent units, of which 21,000 were pure album sales. In its second week, the album fell short to number 45 on the US Billboard 200, selling 12,000 equivalent album units (of that sum, 5,000 were pure album sales).

Track listing

Track notes
 "Big K.R.I.T.", "Get Away", and "The Light" features additional vocals by Rolynne Anderson
 "Subenstein (My Sub IV)" features vocals by Shanell 
 "Aux Cord" and "Keep the Devil Off" features vocals by Nikki Grier
 "Justin Scott" features additional vocals by Rolynne Anderson and John Morris Jr.
 "Keep the Devil Off" is stylized as "Keep the devil Off" throughout the album artwork and promotional material
 "Bury Me In Gold" features additional vocals by Angie Fisher, Jason Morales, and Nikki Greer

Sample credits
  "Big Bank" contains elements from "Tell Me Why Has Our Love Turned Cold", written and performed by Willie Hutch.
  "1999" contains elements from "Piece of My Love", written by Timothy Gatling, Gene Griffin, Aaron Hall, and Edward Riley, as performed by Guy.
  "Get Away" contains elements from "Sleepy People", written and performed by Bettye Crutcher.
  "Mixed Messages" contains elements from "Searching the Circle", written by Ernest Calabria and Barbara Massey, as performed by Barbara & Ernest.
  "Keep the Devil Off" contains elements from "Laugh to Keep from Crying", written by Joseph Jefferson and performed by Nat Turner Rebellion.
  "Higher Calling" contains elements from "13 Gangbanglul", written and performed by Frank Dukes.
  "Drinking Sessions" contains elements from "I Let Love Slip Away", written and performed by David Ruffin.

Personnel
Credits adapted from the album's liner notes.

Performers

 Big K.R.I.T. – primary artist
 T.I. – featured artist (track 3)
 Lloyd – featured artist (track 5)
 Bun B – featured artist (track 6)
 Pimp C – featured artist (track 6)
 CeeLo Green – featured artist (track 7)
 Sleepy Brown – featured artist (track 7)
 Joi – featured artist (track 15)
 Jill Scott – featured artist (track 17)
 Keyon Harrold – featured artist (track 20)
 Bilal – featured artist (track 21)
 Robert Glasper – featured artist (track 21)
 Kenneth Whalum – featured artist (track 21)
 Burniss Earl Travis II – featured artist (track 21)

Instruments

 Markeith Black – guitar (tracks 1, 11, 19)
 DeJuan McCrimmon – keyboards (tracks 1, 19), piano (track 20)
 DJ Wally Sparks – scratching (track 4)
 Sharod Allen – guitar (tracks 6, 8)
 William Washington – bass guitar (tracks 7, 14)
 Mike Hartnett – guitar (tracks 7, 15), bass guitar (tracks 14, 16)
 Keyon Harrold – trumpet (track 7)
 Chin Injeti – bass (tracks 10, 22), guitar (track 10) 
 Rogét Chahayed – keyboards (tracks 10, 22)
 Sam Barsh – keyboards (tracks 10, 12, 22), trumpet (track 10)
 Daniel Seeff – saxophone (track 10), bass guitar (tracks 12, 22)
 Kyle Crane – drums (track 12)
 Daniel Tannenbaum – strings (tracks 12, 15)
 Shedrick Mitchell – organ (track 14)
 Ryan Kilgore – saxophone (track 14)
 Willie Jacks – trombone (track 14)
 Lance Powlis – trumpet (track 14)
 D Whatley – keyboards (track 15)
 Jamire Williams – drums (track 21)
 Robert Glasper – piano (track 21)
 Kenneth Whalum – saxophone (track 21)
 Burniss Earl Travis II – double bass (track 21)

Production

 Big K.R.I.T. – producer (tracks 1, 3, 8, 11, 14, 18, 20, 21)
 Hey DJ – producer (track 2)
 WLPWR – producer (tracks 3, 7, 14, 16, 19)
 Mannie Fresh – producer (tracks 4, 5)
 Cory Mo – producer (track 6)
 Organized Noize – producer (track 6)
 DJ Khalil – producer (tracks 10, 12, 15, 22)
 Rogét Chahayed – producer (tracks 10, 22)
 Supah Mario – producer (tracks 13, 17)
 Bēkon – producer (track 15)
 Robert Glasper – producer (track 21)
 Terrace Martin – producer (track 21)

Charts

References 

2017 albums
Big K.R.I.T. albums
Albums produced by Big K.R.I.T.
Albums produced by DJ Khalil
Albums produced by Mannie Fresh
Albums produced by Organized Noize